Rafał Boguski (born 9 June 1984) is a Polish professional footballer who plays for Puszcza Niepołomice. Mainly a forward, he also plays as a second striker and as a winger.

Club career
Born in Ostrołęka, Boguski began his career at ŁKS Łomża before moving to Ekstraklasa champions Wisła Kraków in 2005. In the 2006–07 season he was loaned out GKS Bełchatów where he contributed with 20 matches and four goals for eventual league runners up. In the following season he returned to Wisła Kraków and won his first Ekstraklasa title with the club.

International career
He made his first appearance for the Poland national football team in a friendly against Bosnia and Herzegovina on 15 December 2007. He scored his first goal for Poland on 14 December 2008 in a match against Serbia. Boguski scored the fastest goal in Polish history, finding the back of the net after only 23 seconds against San Marino on 1 April 2009.

Career statistics

Club

1 All appearances in Ekstraklasa Cup.

International goals

Honours

Club
ŁKS Łomża
Polish Third League: 2003–04

Wisła Kraków
Ekstraklasa: 2007–08, 2008–09, 2010–11

Individual
Polish Third League top goalscorer: 2003–04

References

External links
 
 National team stats on the website of the Polish Football Association 
 

1984 births
Living people
People from Ostrołęka
Sportspeople from Masovian Voivodeship
Association football forwards
Polish footballers
Poland international footballers
Wisła Kraków players
GKS Bełchatów players
Puszcza Niepołomice players
Ekstraklasa players
I liga players